Richard Trevor Barber (3 June 1925 – 7 August 2015) was a New Zealand cricketer who played in one Test in 1956, against the West Indies in Wellington.

Life and career
Barber was born in Otaki, on the Kapiti Coast north of Wellington, where his family had a dairy farm. He attended Wellington College as a boarder.

A middle-order batsman, Barber played for Wellington from 1945–46 to 1958–59, and for Central Districts in 1959–60. He scored his only century, 117, against Otago in Wellington in 1953–54, which was also one of the two Plunket Shield matches in which he kept wicket. He captained Wellington in 1950-51 and 1951–52, and from 1955–56 to 1957–58, and Central Districts in 1959–60. Wellington won the Shield under his captaincy in 1956–57. In a trial match between North Island and South Island in February 1958 he was the only player on either side to score fifty, with 51 in North Island's second innings, but he was not selected for the subsequent tour of England.

Dick Brittenden wrote that Barber "could field anywhere with distinction", especially slips and gully, and that "his cover drive, produced from the best blend of balance and timing, was for the connoisseur". However, it was widely held that his impatience prevented him from achieving his full potential as a batsman.

He worked for the Shell Oil Company, where he was responsible for its sponsorship of cricket and golf. On the death of Sammy Guillen on 1 March 2013, Barber became the oldest surviving New Zealand Test cricketer. Following his death in August 2015, John Reid became the oldest surviving New Zealand Test cricketer.

References

External links
 
 Trevor Barber at Cricinfo
 Trevor Barber at Cricket Archive
 "The first thing you'd do was go out there and dominate the bowlers"

1925 births
2015 deaths
People educated at Wellington College (New Zealand)
New Zealand Test cricketers
New Zealand cricketers
Central Districts cricketers
Wellington cricketers
People from Ōtaki, New Zealand
North Island cricketers